The 2013–14 season will be Videoton FC's 45th competitive season, 14th consecutive season in the OTP Bank Liga and 72nd year in existence as a football club.

Current squad

Transfers

Summer

In:

Out:

Winter

In:

Out:

List of Hungarian football transfers summer 2013
List of Hungarian football transfers winter 2013–14

Statistics

Appearances and goals
Last updated on 1 June 2014.

|-
|colspan="14"|Youth players:

|-
|colspan="14"|Out to loan:

|-
|colspan="14"|Players no longer at the club:

|}

Top scorers
Includes all competitive matches. The list is sorted by shirt number when total goals are equal.

Last updated on 1 June 2014

Disciplinary record
Includes all competitive matches. Players with 1 card or more included only.

Last updated on 1 June 2014

Overall
{|class="wikitable"
|-
|Games played || 48 (30 OTP Bank Liga, 2 Europa League, 3 Hungarian Cup and 13 Hungarian League Cup)
|-
|Games won || 24 (15 OTP Bank Liga, 1 Europa League, 1 Hungarian Cup and 7 Hungarian League Cup)
|-
|Games drawn || 12 (8 OTP Bank Liga, 0 Europa League, 1 Hungarian Cup and 3 Hungarian League Cup)
|-
|Games lost || 12 (7 OTP Bank Liga, 1 Europa League, 1 Hungarian Cup and 3 Hungarian League Cup)
|-
|Goals scored || 85
|-
|Goals conceded || 48
|-
|Goal difference || +37
|-
|Yellow cards || 94
|-
|Red cards || 4
|-
|rowspan="1"|Worst discipline ||  Marco Caneira (14 , 0 )
|-
|rowspan="3"|Best result || 5–1 (H) v Pécs – OTP Bank Liga – 11-08-2013
|-
| 4–0 (H) v Kozármisleny – Ligakupa – 16-10-2013
|-
| 5–1 (A) v Debrecen – Ligakupa – 22-04-2014
|-
|rowspan="1"|Worst result || 1–4 (H) v Paks – Ligakupa – 13-11-2013
|-
|rowspan="1"|Most appearances ||  Paulo Vinícius (40 appearances)
|-
|rowspan="1"|Top scorer ||  Nemanja Nikolić (19 goals)
|-
|Points || 84/144 (58.33%)
|-

Nemzeti Bajnokság I

Matches

Classification

Results summary

Results by round

Hungarian Cup

League Cup

Group stage

Classification

Knockout phase

Europa League

The First and Second Qualifying Round draws took place at UEFA headquarters in Nyon, Switzerland on 24 June 2013.

Pre-season

References

External links
 Eufo
 Official Website
 UEFA
 fixtures and results

Fehérvár FC seasons
Videoton
Videoton